Zawieja is a Polish surname. Notable people with the surname include:

Andrzej Zawieja (born 1940), Polish Olympic sailor
Martin Zawieja (born 1963), West German weightlifter
Philippe Zawieja (fl. 1991–present), French psychologist

Polish-language surnames